Colonel Doyle Raphard Yardley (April 21, 1913 – April 23, 1946) was an American military officer. He was the commanding officer of the 509th Parachute Infantry Battalion, who was captured and later escaped from a German Prisoner of War camp.

During the invasion of Italy, the 509th was dropped behind enemy lines near Avellino. Col. Yardley was captured and spent 16 months as a prisoner of war in Oflag 64 in Szubin, Poland.

Yardley was a resident of Dublin, Texas, and the son of Alvin Alfard Yardley and Emma Edna Huffman. Yardley died shortly after the war of a gunshot wound in the chest received while cleaning his gun.

Diary
He kept a diary of his war experiences which he left behind when he escaped from the camp. It was returned to him after the war and languished in an old military footlocker in Texas until found by his nephew, who published it under the title Home Was Never Like This.

References

External links

1913 births
1946 deaths
United States Army colonels
United States Army personnel of World War II
World War II prisoners of war held by Germany
American prisoners of war in World War II
Deaths by firearm in Texas
Firearm accident victims in the United States
Accidental deaths in Texas